Jeff Nelson may refer to:
 Jeff Nelson (pitcher) (born 1966), American retired baseball player
 Jeff Nelson (umpire) (born 1965), American baseball umpire
 Jeff Nelson (ice hockey) (born 1972), Canadian ice hockey player
 Jeff Nelson (runner), American long-distance runner
 Jeff Nelson (musician) (born 1962), American drummer and graphic designer